The 2011 Baseball World Cup (BWC) was the 39th international Men's amateur baseball tournament. The tournament was sanctioned by the International Baseball Federation, which titled it the Amateur World Series from the 1938 tournament through the 1986 AWS. Panama were first-time hosts (beating out bids from Chinese Taipei and Venezuela), with games held in four cities, from October 1 to 15.

The Netherlands defeated Cuba in the final, winning its first title, and only the second ever for a European team, after Great Britain's win of the inaugural 1938 AWS.

There were 16 participating countries, split into two groups for Round 1, with the first four of each group qualifying for an amalgamated Round 2, which determined the single-game matchups for the finals. Games were played in the Panamanian cities of Aguadulce, Chitré, Panama City and Santiago de Veraguas. The final two medals games were held in Panama City.

This was the final BWC tournament, which was replaced in 2015 by the quadrennial WBSC Premier12.

Teams
Sixteen teams qualified for the tournament, placing high enough in regional tournaments that doubled as qualifying tournaments for the event or by automatic qualification by hosting the tournament.

Format
The 16 participating teams were divided into two round robin pools, the top four of each pool advancing to the second round, in which each qualified team played each of the qualified teams from the other pool. The top two teams in the standings after the second round then qualified for the championship final.

Tie-breaking rules
Standings were determined by the win–loss records over all games played within a pool. In case of a tie, the order of the teams tied was determined by, in this sequence, (a) the win–loss record of the games played among the tied teams (=head-to-head HTH), (b) the highest difference between the ratios of runs scored per offensive innings and runs allowed per defensive innings (=Team's Quality Balance TQB), (c) the highest difference between the ratios of earned runs scored per offensive innings and earned runs allowed per defensive innings (ERTQB), (d) the highest batting average in the games played among the tied teams, (e) a coin flip.

Venues
Panama City was the primary city for the event, and also the host of Group 1, while Aguadulce, Coclé; Santiago de Veraguas; and Chitré, Herrera Province were host to Group 2.

Conditions
The tournament was marred by inclement weather, causing a number of rainout games that had to be made up, increasing the pressure on the tournament schedule. In the end, eleven of the sixteen second-round games needed to be played within two days, requiring teams to play doubleheaders of games shortened to seven innings, and the bronze medal game in the final round had to be canceled to allow the final to be played.

Round 1

Group 1

Standings

Schedule and results

Group 2

Standings

Schedule and results

Round 2

Group 3

Standings

Schedule and results

Final round

7th place game

5th place game

Bronze medal game

Final

Final standings

*Canada awarded third place and bronze medal by rule C12 of the IBAF tournament rules, which states that the ordinary tie-breaking procedure applies in case of a rainout in the final round.

Awards
The IBAF announced the following awards at the completion of the tournament.

References

External links
Official site
IBAF coverage

Baseball World Cup
World Cup
Baseball World Cup
2011
Sports competitions in Panama City
21st century in Panama City
October 2011 sports events in North America